Eufiefferiella is a genus of non-biting midges in the subfamily Orthocladiinae of the bloodworm family Chironomidae.

Chironomidae